The 1870 Michigan gubernatorial election was held on November 1, 1870. Incumbent Republican Henry P. Baldwin defeated Democratic nominee Charles C. Comstock with 53.71% of the vote.

General election

Candidates
Major party candidates
Henry P. Baldwin, Republican
Charles C. Comstock, Democratic
Other candidates
Henry Fish, Prohibition

Results

References

1870
Michigan
Gubernatorial
November 1870 events